Yalishirur  is a village in the southern state of Karnataka, India. It is located in the Gadag taluk of Gadag district in Karnataka.

See also
 Gadag
 Districts of Karnataka

References

External links
 http://Gadag.nic.in/
http://templesofkarnataka.com/navigation/details.php?id=201

Villages in Gadag district